Yushi may refer to:

Mount Yushi, a mountain in Dongyang Township, Guangfeng District, Shangrao, Jiangxi, China
Yushi, Hunan, a town in Xinhuang Dong Autonomous County, Hunan, China
Yushi Subdistrict, in Xishi District, Yingkou, Liaoning, China
Yūshi, a masculine Japanese given name